HMS Zebra was the first ship to bear the name in the British Navy.  She was a 14 gun ship sloop of the Swan class, launched on 8 April 1777.  She was abandoned and blown up after going aground on 22 October 1778 at Little Egg Harbor, New Jersey, during the American Revolutionary War after only one year in service.

References

Winfield, Rif, British Warships in the Age of Sail 1714-1792: Design, Construction, Careers and Fates. Seaforth Publishing, 2007. .

Sloops of the Royal Navy
Shipwrecks of the New Jersey coast
1777 ships
Maritime incidents in 1778
Swan-class ship-sloops